Šajkaška (Шајкашка) is a historical region in northern Serbia. It is southeastern part of Bačka, located in the Autonomous Province of Vojvodina. Territory of Šajkaška is divided among four municipalities: Titel, Žabalj, Novi Sad, and Srbobran. Historical center of Šajkaška is Titel.

Name
Name Šajkaška means "land of šajkaši". Šajkaši were a specific kind of Austrian army, which moved in narrow, long boats, known as "šajka". These military units have operated on the Danube, Tisa, Sava and Moriš rivers. In Hungarian, the region is known as Sajkásvidék and in German as Schajkaschka.

History 
After 1400, the majority of the people in Šajkaška were Serbs who had settled the area before or after the Ottoman conquered the Balkan lands to the south . Moving further north, they had become established at csepel Island where they founded Srpski Kovin (Raczkeve). After 1526 and the Battle of Mohacs, they moved to the northern Danube and to the city of Komarno which, for a long time, was the administrative headquarters of the Šajkaš forces.

After the Treaty of Karlowitz in 1699, the region was part of the Habsburg monarchy. Most of Šajkaška was included into Habsburg Military Frontier (its Danube and Tisa sections), while one part of the region was included into Bodrog County. When these parts of Military Frontier were abolished (in 1750), Šajkaška was included into Theiss District, which was part of the Batsch-Bodrog County within the Habsburg Kingdom of Hungary. In 1763, Šajkaška was excluded from Theiss District and was again placed under military administration. Šajkaš Battalion, as part of Military Frontier, was founded in this area. In the beginning of the Habsburg administration, the population of the region was composed entirely of Serbs, which were brave and skillful warriors. Serb Šajkaši have participated in many battles against the Ottoman Empire.
 
By 1739 and the Peace of Belgrade, the border between Austria and Turkey was moved to the Sava and Danube rivers, and at that time, the idea was proposed to move the Šajkaši down from the north. That was done in 1763-1764. 
 
In 1848-1849, region was part of autonomous Serbian Vojvodina, but was again included into Military Frontier in 1849. In 1852, Šajkaš battalion was transformed into Titel infantry battalion. This military unit was abolished in 1873, and region was again incorporated into Bács-Bodrog County. Administratively, territory of Šajkaška was organized into municipality of Titel and separate municipality of Žabalj was also later established. In 1910, ethnic Serbs formed an absolute majority in both municipalities. Besides Serbs who formed majority in most settlements, region was also populated by Hungarians who formed majority in the village Budisava and sizable minority in few other settlements, Germans who formed sizable minority in several settlements and Rusyns who formed sizable minority in Đurđevo.

In 1918, as part of Banat, Bačka and Baranja region, Šajkaška became part of the Kingdom of Serbia and then part of the newly formed Kingdom of Serbs, Croats and Slovenes (later renamed to Yugoslavia). From 1918 to 1922 Šajkaška was part of the Novi Sad County, from 1922 to 1929 part of the Belgrade Oblast, and from 1929 to 1941 part of the Danube Banovina. From 1941 to 1944, region was occupied by the Axis Powers and was attached to Bács-Bodrog County of the Horthy's Hungary. In 1942 raid, Hungarian occupational authorities killed numerous ethnic Serbs, Jews and Romani in Šajkaška. In 1944, Soviet Red Army and Yugoslav partisans expelled Axis forces from the region and Šajkaška became part of the autonomous province of Vojvodina within new socialist Yugoslavia. Since 1945, AP Vojvodina is part of the People's Republic of Serbia within Yugoslavia. Today, Šajkaška is mainly agricultural region, with well-developed food industry.

Demographics
In 2002, population of Šajkaška numbered 67,355 people, including:
Serbs = 57,418 (85.25%)
Hungarians = 3,170 (4.71%)
Rusyns = 1,474 (2.19%)
Romani = 1,166 (1.73%)
Yugoslavs = 987 (1.47%)
Croats = 511 (0.76%)
Slovaks = 228 (0.34%)

Places of Šajkaška 

Titel municipality:
Titel
Vilovo
Gardinovci
Lok
Mošorin
Šajkaš

Žabalj municipality:
Žabalj
Gospođinci
Đurđevo
Čurug

Novi Sad municipality:
Kovilj
Kać
Budisava

Srbobran municipality:
Nadalj

Note: Titel and Žabalj are towns and administrative centres of municipalities. Other places are villages.

Culture

There is a Serb Orthodox Kovilj monastery in the area. It is situated near the village of Kovilj. The monastery was reconstructed in 1705-1707. According to the legend, the monastery was founded by the first Serb archbishop Saint Sava in the 13th century.

Gallery

See also
 Bačka
 Vojvodina

References

Dragan Kolak, Šajkaška, Enciklopedija Novog Sada, knjiga 30, Novi Sad, 2009.
Titelski letopis, Titel, 2001.

External links
 About Šajkaška (in Serbian)

Geographical regions of Serbia
Historical regions in Serbia
Geography of Vojvodina
Bačka